The Torquays were a popular instrumental surf band from  Orange County from 1994 to 2008. 

The band was originally formed in 1964 by Jerry Gordon and Richard Harmer in Shawnee Mission, Kansas. After Gordon and Harmer moved to Southern California a few years later, the band went dormant until the film Pulp Fiction came out in 1994. Gordon then reformed the band to include: Duff Paulsen (drums), Don Parra (bass), Steve Soest (guitar) and Armin Brown (guitar) who would replace Gordon in the year 2000.

The band recorded several critically acclaimed albums, toured the west coast, appeared on local radio and television and had a small part at the end of the Ron Mann directed film Tales of the Rat Fink (2006) about the life of Ed Roth.

Musical groups established in 1964
Musical groups from Orange County, California
Surf music groups
Musical groups reestablished in 1994
Musical groups disestablished in 2008